The 2019 ACC men's basketball tournament was the 66th annual postseason men's basketball tournament for the Atlantic Coast Conference, held March 12–16, 2019 at the Spectrum Center in Charlotte, North Carolina.

The Virginia Cavaliers and North Carolina Tar Heels entered the tournament as the top two seeds, both with 16–2 conference, and ranked #2 and #3 in the country respectively. Both teams were defeated in the semifinals, by the #4 Florida State Seminoles (ranked #12 nationally) and the #3 Duke Blue Devils (ranked #5 nationally). Duke defeated Florida State, 73–63, in the championship game, claiming their 21st ACC Tournament title and 15th during head coach Mike Krzyzewski's tenure.  Duke's Zion Williamson was named the tournament's MVP.

Seeds
All 15 ACC teams participated in the tournament, seeded by their record within the conference, with a tiebreaker system to seed teams with identical conference records. The top 4 seeds (Virginia, North Carolina, Duke, and Florida State) received a double bye. Virginia Tech, Syracuse, NC State, Louisville, and Clemson receive single byes.  Boston College, Miami, Georgia Tech, Wake Forest, Pittsburgh, and Notre Dame played in the first round.

Schedule
Games were shown on over-the-air television in local media markets by the syndicated ACC Network. Games also aired nationally on various ESPN cable networks with separate telecasts and commentators. The tournament marked the formal end of Raycom Sports' long-term association with the conference; its event rights will now be held by ESPN as part of its new cable channel ACC Network.

Bracket

* denotes overtime period

Source:

Game summaries

First round

Second round

Quarterfinals

Semifinals

Final

Awards and honors
Tournament MVP: Zion Williamson

All-Tournament Teams:

First Team
 RJ Barrett, Duke
 Zion Williamson, Duke
 Mfiondu Kabengele, Florida State
 Cameron Johnson, North Carolina
 Kyle Guy, Virginia

Second Team
 Tre Jones, Duke
 Terance Mann, Florida State
 Luke Maye, North Carolina
 Coby White, North Carolina
 Frank Howard, Syracuse

See also
 2019 ACC women's basketball tournament

References

Tournament
ACC men's basketball tournament
College sports in North Carolina
Basketball competitions in Charlotte, North Carolina
ACC men's basketball tournament
ACC men's basketball tournament